Jake Batchelor (born 13 February 1992) is a former professional Australian rules footballer who played for the Richmond Football Club in the Australian Football League (AFL). Batchelor played his junior footy at the Frankston Rovers in Victoria and went on to play with the Dandenong Stingrays in the TAC Cup, he was drafted to Richmond with their second selection, the 30th overall, in the 2010 AFL draft. He made his AFL debut in round 1, 2011 against Carlton at the MCG. At the end of round 16, 2011, he was nominated for the NAB AFL Rising Star award. Batchelor was delisted by Richmond at the conclusion of the 2017 AFL season, after playing 84 matches over his seven-year tenure at the club.

Statistics
 Statistics are correct to the end of the 2017 season

|- style="background-color: #EAEAEA"
! scope="row" style="text-align:center" | 2011
|style="text-align:center;"|
| 31 || 16 || 0 || 4 || 125 || 77 || 202 || 52 || 49 || 0.0 || 0.3 || 7.8 || 4.8 || 12.6 || 3.3 || 3.1
|-
! scope="row" style="text-align:center" | 2012
|style="text-align:center;"|
| 11 || 14 || 0 || 1 || 121 || 94 || 215 || 70 || 28 || 0.0 || 0.1 || 8.6 || 6.7 || 15.4 || 5.0 || 2.0
|- style="background-color: #EAEAEA"
! scope="row" style="text-align:center" | 2013
|style="text-align:center;"|
| 11 || 9 || 0 || 1 || 75 || 29 || 104 || 40 || 17 || 0.0 || 0.1 || 8.3 || 3.2 || 11.6 || 4.4 || 1.9
|-
! scope="row" style="text-align:center" | 2014
|style="text-align:center;"|
| 11 || 13 || 3 || 0 || 80 || 45 || 125 || 38 || 27 || 0.2 || 0.0 || 6.2 || 3.5 || 9.6 || 2.9 || 2.1
|- style="background-color: #EAEAEA"
! scope="row" style="text-align:center" | 2015
|style="text-align:center;"|
| 11 || 23 || 1 || 1 || 178 || 105 || 283 || 111 || 44 || 0.0 || 0.0 || 7.7 || 4.6 || 12.3 || 4.8 || 1.9
|-
! scope="row" style="text-align:center" | 2016
|style="text-align:center;"|
| 11 || 8 || 0 || 1 || 58 || 28 || 86 || 21 || 7 || 0.0 || 0.1 || 7.3 || 3.5 || 10.8 || 2.6 || 0.9
|- style="background-color: #EAEAEA"
! scope="row" style="text-align:center" | 2017
|style="text-align:center;"|
| 11 || 1 || 0 || 0 || 5 || 4 || 9 || 2 || 4 || 0.0 || 0.0 || 5.0 || 4.0 || 9.0 || 2.0 || 4.0
|- class="sortbottom"
! colspan=3| Career
! 84
! 4
! 8
! 642
! 382
! 1024
! 334
! 176
! 0.0
! 0.1
! 7.6
! 4.5
! 12.2
! 4.0
! 2.1
|}

References

External links

 

Jake Batchelor's statistics from Footy Wire

1992 births
Living people
Richmond Football Club players
Dandenong Stingrays players
Frankston Bombers players
Coburg Football Club players
Frankston Football Club players
Sandringham Football Club players
Australian rules footballers from Victoria (Australia)
Australian people of Welsh descent